The Ipswich Docks, Ipswich wet dock and the wet dock, are a series of docks in Port of Ipswich located at a bend of the River Orwell which has been used for trade since at least the 8th Century. A wet dock was constructed in 1842 which was 'the biggest enclosed dock in the United Kingdom' at the time. A major regeneration of the area has taken place since 1999.

History

Economic stagnation
Although Ipswich had enjoyed "a great trade"inn the sixteenth century, by the seventeenth century this had gone into decline. This in turn had led to the neglect of basis facilities, such as the Common Quay, which was no longer accessible by vessels with a draft of 8 feet or more: such vessels had to transfer their cargoes into lighters three miles downstream at Downham Reach.

Initial work
.

In 1837 an Act of Parliament allowed the Ipswich Dock Commissioners to construct a new wet dock whilst also placing certain conditions on them. In addition to building the wet dock and providing a diversion for the river Orwell along a 'New Cut' to the west of the dock the commissioners were to allow all persons, with cattle and carriages, may thereby have free access to the dock and quays and the sides of the said new cut and channel and also to contribute to the health and recreation of the inhabitants [of Ipswich]. The Ipswich Dock Commission was provided with investment of £25,000 and the right to borrow a further £100,000 but needed a further loan of £20,000 and also an additional levy of six pence per tonne on all imported coal to fund the project. The dock opened in 1842; the original lock gates entered the dock from the New Cut opposite Felaw Street. The new custom house (now known as the 'Old Custom House') was completed in 1845.

The development attracted new industries to the dock area such as the coprolite factory founded by Edward Packard in 1849. This factory gave its name to Coprolite Street in the docks area.

Renovation following 1877 Act

The Ipswich Docks Act of 1877 allowed for the construction of a new lock in their present position to facilitate access to the dock and allow trams to operate along the length of the 'Island' between New Cut and the dock. The new lock gates were constructed by the time of the 1898 Act which authorised the construction of a swing bridge.

Ipswich Docks Act of 1913 allowed for the construction of a new entrance to the docks comprising inner and outer gates and a swing bridge, a quay and various tramways and also allowed for the 'stopping off' of various rights of way. There was however a condition that work had to be completed within 10 years and following World War I an extension was granted by an Act of Parliament in 1918.

1950-1973
The Ipswich Dock Act 1971 authorised the development of the West Bank to allow ro-ro ships to dock. The Ipswich Dock Commission was reconstituted as the Ipswich Port Authority in 1973 when the first stage of the development was completed, further work was carried out in 1977 and 1979 and then again in 1998.

Legislation
Ipswich Dock Act 1837
Ipswich Dock Act 1852
Ipswich Dock Act 1877
Ipswich Dock Act 1898
Ipswich Dock Act 1913
Ipswich Dock Act 1918
Ipswich Dock Revision Order 1969 (Statutory Instrument 1969/1521)
Ipswich Dock Act 1971

Ipswich Dock Commission
Many notable local individuals were Dock Commissioners.

References

Port of Ipswich